Lawrence Theodore Savage (17 February 1928 – 27 September 2013) was a New Zealand rugby union player. A half-back, Savage represented Canterbury (while a student at Canterbury University College), Wellington and Bush at a provincial level, and was a member of the New Zealand national side, the All Blacks, in 1949. He played 12 matches for the All Blacks including three internationals.

Savage was educated at Nelson College from 1941 to 1945. He died in 2013. He died in Lower Hutt on 27 September 2013, and his ashes were buried at Taitā Lawn Cemetery.

References

1928 births
2013 deaths
People educated at Nelson College
University of Canterbury alumni
New Zealand rugby union players
New Zealand international rugby union players
New Zealand civil engineers
Rugby union players from Nelson, New Zealand
Canterbury rugby union players
Wellington rugby union players
Bush rugby union players
Burials at Taitā Lawn Cemetery